Sgurr Mhic Bharraich (779 m) is a mountain in the Northwest Highlands, Scotland, at the head of Loch Duich in Ross-shire.

The mountain is the last peak on the south side of Glen Shiel, and is also quieter for climbers than many of its higher neighbours. The views from its summit are excellent.

References

Mountains and hills of the Northwest Highlands
Marilyns of Scotland
Corbetts